Exercises in Futility may refer to:

 Exercises in Futility (Marc Ribot album), 2008
 Exercises in Futility (Mgła album), 2015